Yamhill Carlton School District is a school district headquartered in Yamhill, Oregon.

Schools
 Yamhill Carlton High School (YCHS) (Yamhill)
 Yamhill Carlton Intermediate School (YCIS) (Yamhill)
 Yamhill Carlton Elementary School (YCES) (Carlton)

References

External links

 Yamhill Carlton School District

School districts in Oregon
Education in Yamhill County, Oregon